Bill Jones Afwani (born 1992) is a Kenyan film director and producer whose first short film Sticking Ribbons was selected at the 2014 Zanzibar International Film Festival and won the Signis award for "Best East African Talent". He frequently collaborates with friend Njue Kevin with whom together they run the production company Rocque Pictures.

References

1992 births
Kenyan film directors
Living people
Place of birth missing (living people)